Deepdene may refer to:

Places
Australia
 Deepdene, Victoria, Australia, a suburb of Melbourne, in the state of Victoria
Deepdene railway station, Melbourne
 Deepdene, Western Australia, a locality in the south-west of the state of Western Australia
United Kingdom
 Deepdene, Surrey, an area of the Surrey town of Dorking in England
Dorking Deepdene railway station (formerly Deepdene railway station)
 Deepdene House and Gardens (site of former house in Surrey)

Other uses
 Deepdene (diamond), an irradiated diamond
 Deepdene (typeface), a serif typeface by Frederic Goudy

See also